Leubatal is a former Verwaltungsgemeinschaft ("collective municipality") in the district of Greiz, in Thuringia, Germany. The seat of the Verwaltungsgemeinschaft was in Hohenleuben. It was disbanded on 31 December 2013.

The Verwaltungsgemeinschaft Leubatal consisted of the following municipalities:

Hain 
Hohenleuben
Hohenölsen 
Kühdorf 
Lunzig 
Neugernsdorf 
Schömberg 
Steinsdorf 
Teichwitz 
Wildetaube

Former Verwaltungsgemeinschaften in Thuringia